Hans-Jürgen Bombach (born 11 August 1945, in Wehrsdorf) is a former sprinter who specialized in the 100 and 200 metres. He represented East Germany and competed for the club SC Dynamo Berlin.

On 20 July 1973 he established a new European record in 100 metres with 10.0 seconds in Dresden. The next day he ran the 200 m on the same track and set a new East German record of 20.2 seconds.

Achievements

References

1945 births
Living people
People from Bautzen (district)
East German male sprinters
Sportspeople from Saxony
Olympic athletes of East Germany
Athletes (track and field) at the 1972 Summer Olympics
European Athletics Championships medalists